JWH-145 (1-naphthalenyl(1-pentyl-5-phenyl-1H-pyrrol-3-yl)-methanone) is a synthetic cannabinoid from the naphthoylpyrrole family which acts as an agonist of the CB1 (Ki = 14 ± 2nM) and CB2 (Ki = 6.4 ± 0.4nM) receptors, with a moderate (~2.2x) selectivity for the CB2 receptor. JWH-145 was first synthesized in 2006 by John W. Huffman and colleagues to examine the nature of ligand binding to the CB1 receptor.

Legality
In the United States JWH-145 is not federally scheduled, although some states have passed legislation banning the sale, possession, and manufacture of JWH-145.

In Canada, JWH-145 and other naphthoylpyrrole-based cannabinoids are Schedule II controlled substances under the Controlled Drugs and Substances Act.

In the United Kingdom, JWH-145 and other naphthoylpyrrole-based cannabinoids are considered Class B drugs under the Misuse of Drugs Act 1971.

See also
List of JWH cannabinoids
Synthetic cannabinoid

References 

JWH cannabinoids
CB1 receptor agonists
CB2 receptor agonists
Designer drugs
Naphthoylpyrroles